The modern Filipino alphabet, otherwise known as the Filipino alphabet, is the alphabet of the Filipino language, the official national language and one of the two official languages of the Philippines. The modern Filipino alphabet is made up of 28 letters, which includes the entire 26-letter set of the ISO basic Latin alphabet, the Spanish Ñ and the Ng digraph of Tagalog. It replaced the Pilipino Abakada alphabet of the Fourth Republic. Today, the modern Filipino alphabet may also be used to write all autochthonous languages of the Philippines and Chavacano, a Spanish-derived creole.

In 2013, the Komisyon sa Wikang Filipino released the Ortograpiyang Pambansa ("National Orthography"), a new set of guidelines that resolved phonemic representation problems previously encountered when writing some Philippine languages and dialects.

Alphabet

C, F, J, Ñ, Q, V, X, and Z are not used in native Filipino words.

Letters
The 28 letters of the Alpabeto are called títik or létra, and each represents a spoken sound. These are classed either as  patínig or bokáblo (vowels) and katínig or konsonánte (consonants).

The letters' names are pronounced and collated in the same way as English, except for Ñ .

Consonants 
The Abakada developed in the early 20th century had fewer consonants. By the middle of the century, letters (baybayin) were added and later on reduced due to its ideology which is English that is approximately radical to English alphabet with the release of the Ortograpiyang Pambansa in 2014. It was a major change to add these letters and thus modernise the writing system and to preserve sounds that are found in native Philippine languages. The digraphs and manuscripts were chosen to be placed in other wordings for privileges and adaptations.

Examples of the added letters:

Vowels 
Most languages in the Philippines share vowels /a/, /i/, and /u/. After centuries of Spanish colonisation and the standardisation of Filipino as the national lingua franca, the vowels /e/ and /o/ became more common.

See also
Filipino orthography
Abakada alphabet
Suyat
Philippine Braille

References

External links
Commission on the Filipino Language website 
Commission on the Filipino Language wiki

Latin alphabets
Filipino language
Cebuano language
Hiligaynon language
Ilocano language